The 1961 season of the Primera División Peruana, the top category of Peruvian football, was played by 10 teams. The national champions were Sporting Cristal.

Results

Standings

National title play-off

External links 
 Peru 1961 season at RSSSF
 Peruvian Football League News 

Peru1
1961 in Peruvian football
Peruvian Primera División seasons